"Chase" is Kumi Koda's 12th domestic CD single. It reached No. 18 on Oricon and stayed on the charts for eight weeks.

Information
Chase is Japanese R&B-turned-pop singer-songwriter Kumi Koda's twelfth single. The single failed to chart in the top ten on Oricon, coming it at No. 18. Despite this, the single charted for eight weeks.

The single continued her transition from an R&B artist to a pop artist, whereas both this song and her last single, Love & Honey, were categorized under the pop genre. This is most notably due to Love & Honey starting her new album era of secret.

The title song is the ending theme for ANB's program Summer〜Suspicious of Yuka xx What it Becomes!! (さまぁ〜ずと優香の怪しい××貸しちゃうのかよ!! / SAMAA〜to Yuka no ayashii××kashi chau no kayo!!).

Despite the a-side being Chase, the single's artwork was inspired more by its b-side, Heat, which featured reggae duo MEGARYU, composed of MEGA HORN and RYU REX.

Music video
The video features two thieves (both played by Kumi): a jewel thief and a bank robber. The jewel thief takes on the job as a hotel maid, going into others' rooms and stealing their prized jewels. The bank robber is staying in the same hotel, unaware there are police searching for her downstairs in the lobby. When the jewel thief sees the police, she willingly accepts her arrest, only to see that the officers had found and arrested the bank robber, instead.

The ending scene leads into Kumi's next single, Kiseki.

Track listing

Chart history
Peak position: #18

Sales
First week estimate: 11,764
Total estimate: 21,690

Alternate versions
Chase
Chase: Found on the single (2004) and corresponding album secret (2005)
Chase [Instrumental]: Found on the single (2004)
Chase [Caramel Pod Remix]: Found on Koda Kumi Driving Hit's 3 (2011)

Heat feat. MEGARYU
Heat feat. MEGARYU: Found on the single (2004)
Heat feat. MEGARYU [Instrumental]: Found on the single (2004)
Heat feat. MEGARYU [REO Remix]: Found on Beach Mix (2012)

References

External links
Avex Network (2005), Kumi Koda Official Web Site
Oricon Style (2005), Ranking – Oricon Style

2004 singles
2004 songs
Koda Kumi songs
Rhythm Zone singles
Songs written by Koda Kumi